Omniverse .:. Frequency is the sixth studio album by Rake., released in 2002 by VHF Records.

Track listing

Personnel 
Adapted from the Omniverse .:. Frequency liner notes.
Rake.
Jim Ayre – electric guitar, vocals
Bill Kellum – bass guitar
Carl Moller – drums, saxophone

Release history

References

External links 
 Omniverse .:. Frequency at Discogs (list of releases)

2002 albums
Rake (band) albums
VHF Records albums